Kanal 7 is a Turkish nationwide Islamic TV channel established and  on 27 July 1994. It has a terrestrial broadcast licence, and it is also available throughout Turkey via satellite. It airs Indian and Korean dramas. The channel is popular for Indian shows in Turkey. The show such as Bir Garip Ask is very much popular Indian show in Turkey followed by many Indian shows are aired in Turkey.

From 1995 to 1997 Ayşe Önal hosted a discussion show Minefield on Kanal 7 which brought Jews, Armenians and Turks together five days a week in a way not previously seen on Turkish television.

Logos

References

External links 

Television stations in Turkey
Television channels and stations established in 1994